The Kimfly Alpin (Alpine) is a Slovenian single-place paraglider that was designed in collaboration with Michaël Nessler and was produced by Kimfly of Vodice. It is now out of production.

Design and development
The Alpin was designed as a mountain descent glider. The models are each named for their approximate wing area in square metres.

Variants
Alpin 24
Small-sized model for lighter pilots. The glider model is Slovenian certified.
Alpin 27
Mid-sized model for medium-weight pilots. The glider model is Slovenian certified.

Specifications (Alpin 27)

See also
Kimfly River

References

Alpin
Paragliders